Black Symphonies (An Orchestral Journey) is an orchestral compilation album from German futurepop band Blutengel. It was promoted as a classical 'best of'.

Background
After performing at the first Gothic Meets Klassik festival 2012 at Neues Gewandhaus, Leipzig, 'Die With You' and 'Ein Augenblick', two of the eight songs played were played in their classical style during their Monument tour. They were recorded on the live album 'Once in A Lifetime'. The response to both the Gothic Meets Klassik and 'Once in A Lifetime' performance was positive, and Blutengel began a classical tour with the 'Monument Ensemble' performing the eight songs from Gothic Meets Klassik, plus five songs rewritten for the chamber ensemble. All of the tracks were arranged by Conrad Oleak, who did the original arrangements for the songs performed at Gothic Meets Klassik.

From this came 'Black Symphonies', and a new song entitled 'Krieger' (Warrior) with 'Legend' (Actually 'Legend Part 2' from the Monument bonus disc) and 'Monument' serving as an intro and outro to the album. It was released as a CD, CD+DVD and Box Set. The DVD has four performances from the Gothic Meets Klassik, including 'Die With You' and 'Ein Augenblick' which were omitted from the album itself. The box set contains the CD+DVD, a Black Symphonies T-shirt, a signed page of sheet music from 'Reich Mir Die Hand' and the Krieger single. The Krieger single was later released through digital retailers, but the music video to promote both the album and the single was set to the symphonic version of the song.

Track listing

Credits
 Written-By and male vocals: Chris Pohl
 Female vocals: Ulrike Goldmann
 Performer: The Monument Orchestra
 Arranged By, Mixed By, Producer, Soloist, Grand Piano: Conrad Oleak
 Mixed By, Soloist, Acoustic Guitar: Rainer Oleak
 Soloist, Cello: Ekaterina Zaplakhova
 Soloist, Clarinet: Uta Gerwig
 Soloist, Drums, Percussion: Michael Merkert
 Soloist, Viola – Mirjam Beyer
 Soloist, Violin: Charlotte Blumenberg
 Photography By: Mandy Privenau
 Recorded By [Vocal]: Mario Rühlicke
 Mastered By: Calyx Mastering

References

External links

2014 compilation albums
Blutengel albums